Fluxinella discula is a species of sea snail, a marine gastropod mollusk in the family Seguenziidae.

Description
The height of the shell attains 6.5 mm.

Distribution
This species occurs in the Gulf of Mexico off Texas, in the Caribbean Sea off Cuba and Domenica.

References

 Rosenberg, G., F. Moretzsohn, and E. F. García. 2009. Gastropoda (Mollusca) of the Gulf of Mexico, Pp. 579–699 in Felder, D.L. and D.K. Camp (eds.), Gulf of Mexico–Origins, Waters, and Biota. Biodiversity. Texas A&M Press, College Station, Texas.

discula
Gastropods described in 1889